The 2013 World Para-archery Championships were the 12th edition of the World Para Archery Championships. The event took place in Thailand between November 1-7.

Medal table

Medalists

Individual events

Team events

References

World Championship
World Archery
A
World championships in archery
International archery competitions hosted by Thailand